Octavian Andrei Ionescu (born 1 October 1949) is a Romanian former footballer who played as a midfielder.

International career
Octavian Ionescu played two games at international level for Romania, both of them being friendlies against Czechoslovakia.

Honours
Sportul Studențesc București
Cupa României runner-up: 1978–79
Balkans Cup: 1979–80, runner-up: 1976

Olympiakos Nicosia
Cypriot Second Division: 1983–84

References

External links

1949 births
Living people
Romanian footballers
Romania international footballers
Association football midfielders
Liga I players
Liga II players
Cypriot Second Division players
FC Universitatea Cluj players
CFR Cluj players
FC Sportul Studențesc București players
Olympiakos Nicosia players
Romanian expatriate footballers
Expatriate footballers in Cyprus
Romanian expatriate sportspeople in Cyprus
Footballers from Bucharest